Daniel Cauchy (13 March 1930 – 8 May 2020) was a French film actor and producer. He was known for his role in Jean-Pierre Melville's 1956 crime film Bob le flambeur. 

He died from COVID-19.

His son Didier Cauchy also became an actor.

Partial filmography

 Nous irons à Monte-Carlo (1951) - Un fan de Melissa (uncredited)
 L'Amour, Madame (1952) - Patrick -un jeune homme
 The Green Glove (1952) - Minor Role (uncredited)
 Crimson Curtain (1952) - Léon
 Follow That Man (1953) - Pierrot
 When You Read This Letter (1953) - Biquet
 Maternité clandestine (1953) - Mickey
 His Father's Portrait (1953) - L'existentialiste (uncredited)
 The Count of Monte Cristo (1954) - Bruno
 Touchez pas au Grisbi (1954) - Fifi
 Les Impures (1954) - Dédé
 Huis-clos (1954) - (uncredited)
 The Price of Love (1955) - Paulo
 Black Dossier (1955) - Jo
 Nights of Montmartre (1955) - Julien
 Impasse des vertus (1955) - Fanfan
 Bob le flambeur (1956) - Paulo
 Police judiciaire (1958) - Raoul Menaz
 En légitime défense (1958) - Dédé
 Miss Pigalle (1958) - Clo-Clo
 Sacrée jeunesse (1958) - Gérard
 Ça n'arrive qu'aux vivants (1959) - Bébert
 I Spit on Your Grave (1959) - Sonny
 Secret professionnel (1959) - Michel Langeac
 Sergeant X (1960) - Fred
 Les mordus (1960) - Mosco
 Samedi soir (1961) - Jacky
 A Touch of Treason (1962) - Patrick Lemoine
 Arsène Lupin contre Arsène Lupin (1962) - Charly
 Mathias Sandorf (1962) - Pescade
 D'où viens-tu Johnny? (1963) - Marcel
 The Troops of St. Tropez (1964) - Richard
 Le coeur fou (1970) - Photographe
 La liberté en croupe (1970) - Un automobiliste dans l'embouteillage (uncredited)
 Le gang des otages (1973) - Gilbert Nodier
 La fille d'Amérique (1977) - Luc
 Actors (2000) - Christian Decharme (final film role)

References

Bibliography 
 Gifford, Barry. Out of the Past. University Press of Mississippi, 2001.

External links 
 

1930 births
2020 deaths
French male film actors
Film people from Paris
Deaths from the COVID-19 pandemic in France